BPM Entertainment, also known as Big Planet Made, is a South Korean entertainment company established in 2021. The company is best known as the home to the trio Viviz, solo artists Soyou, Huh Gak, Ha Sung-woon, Lee Mu-jin, Be'O, Mighty Mouth, Ren and actress Jo Soo-min.

History

2021–present: Founding and expansion
On September 29, Soyou signed with BPM Entertainment after leaving Starship Entertainment. She became the first artist to sign with the company.

On October 6, it was announced that former GFriend members, Eunha, SinB and Umji, signed a contract with BPM Entertainment to debut as a trio. On October 8, 2021, it was announced their new group name would be Viviz. Viviz debuted on February 9, 2022 with the EP Beam of Prism.

On October 27, Huh Gak signed with BPM Entertainment after his contract with IST Entertainment expired.

On October 29, Big Planet Made announced that they had signed a memorandum of understanding with Million Market and Swing Entertainment, thus forming a strategic alliance and business agreement.

On December 24, former Hotshot and Wanna One member Ha Sung-woon signed a contract with BPM Entertainment after the expiration of his contract with Star Crew Entertainment.

On March 1, 2022, it was announced that Lee Mu-jin had signed an exclusive contract with the company.

On March 8, Be'O signed a management deal with BPM Entertainment.

On April 29, actress Jo Soo-min signed an exclusive contract with the company. She is the first actress to be signed under BPM Entertainment.

On May 3, Mighty Mouth signed an exclusive contract with BPM Entertainment.

On May 7, former NU'EST member Ren signed an exclusive contract with BPM Entertainment.

Artists

Groups 
 Viviz
 Mighty Mouth

Soloists 
 Soyou
 Huh Gak
 Ha Sung-woon
 Lee Mu-jin
 Be'O (in cooperation with FameUs Entertainment)
 Ren

Actors/Actresses 
 Jo Soo-min

Discography

2022

2023

References

External links
 

BPM Entertainment
K-pop record labels
South Korean record labels
Talent agencies of South Korea
2021 establishments in South Korea
Companies based in Seoul
Entertainment companies established in 2021
Record labels established in 2021